Latham (pronounced 'lay-thm') is an Old Scandinavian surname.

Origins and variants
The surname may derive from a place called "Latham". The word is related to a "(place of or by) the barns", related to the Old Norse hlatha, barn. Lathom in Lancashire is recorded as "Latune" in the Domesday Book of 1086 which is related to the region of Latium, and in the 1201 Pipe Rolls of the county as "Lathum".  "Laytham" in East Yorkshire appears as "Ladone" in the Domesday Book. Locational surnames were usually acquired by those former inhabitants of a place who moved to another area, and were thereafter best identified by the name of their birthplace. The modern surname can found as "Latham", "Lathom", "Laytham", "Leatham", "Lathem", "Latam", "Leedham", "Lazom", and "Lazem". The first recorded spelling of the surname is shown to be that of Robert de Latham (witness), which was dated 1204, in the "Yorkshire Assize Court Rolls", during the reign of King John, known as "Lackland", 1199 – 1216.

People with the surname 
 Aaron Latham (1943-2022), American journalist
 Alexis Latham (born 1965), British actor
 Arlie Latham (1860–1952), American baseball player
 Arthur Latham (footballer) (1863–1928), British footballer
 Arthur Latham (1930–2016), British politician
 Baldwin Latham (1836–1917), British civil engineer; son of George Latham (architect)
 Cassandra Latham, British witch
 Charles Latham (1816–1907), English physician and surgeon
 Charles Latham (photographer) (1847–1912)
 Charles Latham (1882–1968), Australian politician
 Charles Latham, 1st Baron Latham (1888–1970), British politician
 Chris Latham (baseball) (born 1973), American baseball player
 Chris Latham (rugby union) (born 1975), Australian rugby union player
 Christine Latham (born 1981), Canadian soccer player
 Sir David Latham (born 1942), British judge
 Earle O. Latham (1908–1999), First Vice President of the Federal Reserve Bank of Boston and U.S. State Department special emissary to Ethiopia to establish the National Bank of Ethiopia
 George Latham (architect), (died 1871), British architect
 George William Latham (1827–1886), English landowner, barrister and Liberal politician
 Helen Latham (born 1976), British actress
 Hubert Latham (1883–1912), French aviator
 James Latham (criminal) (1942–1965), American serial killer
 James Latham (painter) (c. 1696 – 1747), Irish painter
 Jean Lee Latham (1902–1995), American writer
 Jody Latham (born 1982), British actor
 John Latham (1761–1843) English physician, President of the Royal College of Physicians
 John Latham (1787–1853), English poet
 John Latham (artist) (1921–2006), British conceptual artist
 John Latham (judge) (1877–1964), Chief Justice of the High Court of Australia
 John Latham (ornithologist) (1740–1837), British ornithologist
 Larry Latham (1952–2003), American wrestler
 Laurie Latham (born 1955), British record producer
 Lonnie Latham (born 1946), American Baptist pastor
 Mark Latham (born 1961), former Australian Labor politician
 Michael Latham (1942–2017), British politician
 Mike Latham (born 1939), former English cricketer
 Milton Latham (1827–1882), US Senator and Governor of California
 Peter Latham (tennis) (1865–1953), British racquets and real tennis player
 Peter Wallwork Latham (1832–1923), English physician and professor of medicine
 Philip Latham (1929–2020), British actor
 Philip Latham, pen name of Robert S. Richardson (1902–1981), American astronomer
 Richard Latham (1908–1953), Brazilian cricketer
 Robert Latham (editor) (1912–1995), co-editor of the diary of Samuel Pepys
 Robert Gordon Latham (1812–1888), British ethnologist
 Rod Latham (born 1961), New Zealand cricketer
 Simon Latham (fl. 1618), English writer on falconry
 Thomas Latham (cricketer) (1847–1926), English barrister and cricketer
 Thomas J. Latham (1831–1911), American lawyer and businessman
 Tom Latham (cricketer) (born 1992), New Zealand cricketer
 Tom Latham (politician) (born 1948), American politician
 Vida Latham (1866–1958), British-American physician
 William Latham (computer scientist) (born 1961), British computer artist
 William P. Latham (1917–2004), American composer
 Woodville Latham (1837–1911), American inventor

See also
 Baron Latham

References

English-language surnames
Surnames of Scandinavian origin
English toponymic surnames

de:Latham